The following is an episode list for the Disney Channel India show, Dhoom Machaao Dhoom.

Episode list

Production
The First Session of Dhoom Machaao Dhoom was shot at a stretch from May–December 2006. It premiered on 8 January 2007.

Season 1: January–February 2007

Season 2: February–May 2007

Season 3: May–July 2007

References

Lists of children's television series episodes
Lists of Indian television series episodes